There are three different addressing schemes for display devices: direct, matrix, and raster.  The purpose of each scheme is to set (or maintain) the state of a pixel to either black/white or, more commonly, a grayscale level.

Direct addressing
A direct addressed display runs individual control signals to each pixel.  This allows the state, whether on/off or grayscale, to be set and maintained on each pixel.  For a screen size of m×n pixels, this scheme would require m×n control signals.  This is generally considered to be an inefficient use of I/O and physical space. Direct addressing mode means that the value for a given instruction in assembly programming is pointed to by a given value. This means the value is variable, based on what is stored in memory at a given address

Matrix addressing
A matrix addressed display runs control signals only to the rows and columns of the display.  (See also: matrix)  For a screen size of m×n pixels, this scheme would require m+n control signals. In active matrix addressing, some sort of capacitor (external to the cell proper) is used to maintain the state of the cell. Passive matrix addressing is used when cell itself has a bistability, so no external capacitor is needed. In some situations passive matrix addressing is used with the help of persistence of vision of the (usually human) eye so the cell need not be bistable.  Persistence of vision is used in simpler, slower changing displays such as clocks.

Raster addressing
A raster addressed display (e.g., a CRT) works by scanning across the entire display in sequence while modulating control signal to activate each pixel as it is scanned.  This display uses persistence of the pixel element (e.g., phosphor) to maintain the pixel state until the scan can visit that pixel again.  There are only three control signals required for this to work: a horizontal scan control signal, a vertical scan control signal, and an intensity control signal.  Timing between these signals is very important, else the image on the screen will show artifacts.

Display technology